Lucía Sánchez (1969) is a Spanish-born French actress. She started her acting career in 1996 with Une robe d'été (A Summer Dress)  directed by François Ozon.

She starred in  directed by Yves Caumon with Bernard Blancan,  directed by Jean-Paul Civeyrac,  directed by Gilles Marchand.
In theater she worked with Renaud Cojo, Michel Dydim, Valérie Crunchant, Christophe Guichet, Laurence de la Fuente and others.

Sanchez is also a film director. She has directed three short movies and two documentaries.

Filmography

Actress
1996 : Une robe d'été directed by François Ozon
1998 : Scène de lit directed by François Ozon
1998 : Sitcom directed by François Ozon
1999 :  by Delphine Gleize
1999 :  directed by Jean-Paul Civeyrac
2001 : With all my Love directed by Amalia Escriva
2002 : Carnage directed by Delphine Gleize
2003 :  directed by Edgardo Cozarinsky
2003 : My children's are different directed by Denis Dercourt
2003 : Who Killed Bambi? directed by Gilles Marchand
2005 :  directed by Yves Caumon
2005 : Time Has Come directed by Alain Guiraudie
2006 : Sœur Thérèse.com TV Episode, directed by Christophe Douchand
2007 : Je suis une amoureuse directed by Jocelyne Desverchère
2007 : Décroche directed by Manuel Schapira
2007 : Cap Nord directed by Sandrine Rinaldi
2009 : The Queen of Hearts directed by Valérie Donzelli
2010 : Camping 2 directed by Fabien Onteniente

Director
 1998 : Les mains de Violeta
 2000 : Siestes
 2002 : Las amigas (documentary)
 2003 : Salomé!!!!
 2005 : Pick up (documentary)
 2008 : Profanations: prize from the public at Créteil International Women's Film Festival
 2010 :  Les belles et les bêtes, documentary
 2011 : La guerre du golf, documentary
 2012 : Boulevard movie, short film

External links

1969 births
Living people
French stage actresses
French film directors
French film actresses